Archibald Beveridge Paterson (13 July 1908 – 1995) was a Scottish footballer who played in the Scottish League for Dunfermline Athletic, Forfar Athletic and Montrose as a wing half.

Personal life 
Paterson was the younger half-brother of footballer Bill Paterson and the son of football manager Sandy Paterson.

Career statistics

References 

Scottish footballers
Scottish Football League players
Dunfermline Athletic F.C. players
1908 births
1995 deaths
Date of death missing
Footballers from Fife
People from Hill of Beath
Association football wing halves
Association football outside forwards
Forfar Athletic F.C. players
Montrose F.C. players